Mark Chaplin, Jr. (1856 – 1929) was a tailor and politician in Newfoundland. He represented Bonavista in the Newfoundland House of Assembly from 1900 to 1908.

The son of Mark Chaplin, he was born in St. John's and was educated at Fort Townshend School. He apprenticed as a tailor and set up his own business in 1875. Elected to the Newfoundland assembly in 1900 and 1904, Chaplin did not run for reelection in 1908. Chaplin became the first elected president of the Masonic Club in 1896. From 1895 to 1920, he was president of the Newfoundland Football League, a soccer league.

Chaplin advertised himself as the "King of Tailors".

References 

Members of the Newfoundland and Labrador House of Assembly
1856 births
1929 deaths
Dominion of Newfoundland politicians
Newfoundland Colony people